The Warren Redskins were a minor league baseball team located in Warren, Pennsylvania in 1940. The following season the team changed it name the Warren Buckeyes and were unaffiliated. The team disbanded in 1941 and the league disbanded in 1942, due to the manning shortages associated with World War II.

Notable alumni
Earl Henry
Alex McColl
Saul Rogovin

References

Baseball teams established in 1940
Baseball teams disestablished in 1941
Professional baseball teams in Pennsylvania
Defunct minor league baseball teams
Cleveland Guardians minor league affiliates
1940 establishments in Pennsylvania
1941 disestablishments in Pennsylvania
Warren County, Pennsylvania
Defunct baseball teams in Pennsylvania
Pennsylvania State Association teams